This is a list of canneries and cannery towns in British Columbia, Canada.

Fish and seafood
Alert Bay
Alexandra a.k.a. Alexander (Skeena River)
Arrandale (Nass River)
Balmoral (Skeena River)
Bliss Landing
Bones Bay
Boswell
Butedale
Carlisle (Skeena River)
Claxton (Skeena River)
Fort Langley
Forward Harbour
Glendale Cove
Gulf of Georgia Cannery (Steveston)
Kingcome
Longview
Namu
Porcher Island Cannery (Skeena River)
Port Essington
Port Essington (a.k.a. Essington, Skeena River)
Port Simpson
Redonda Bay
Roy
Seaside Park, a.k.a. Seaside
Shoal Bay
Shushartie
Sommerville Cannery in Prince Rupert
St. Vincent Bay
Tallheo
Toba Inlet
Vancouver Bay
Waglisla
Wales Island Cannery (Pearse Canal)

Fruit and vegetables
Mission, British Columbia (Empress Foods)
Royal City Foods Nabob (Delnor)

See also
 List of canneries
 List of salmon canneries and communities

Geography of British Columbia
History of British Columbia
Coast of British Columbia
Company towns in Canada
First Nations history in British Columbia
 
British Columbia-related lists